Comfort Annor (1949 – 22 February 2015) was a Ghanaian musician known for her soothing unique voice, alternating between a mezzo-soprano and a contralto in the 90s.

Biography

Comfort Annor also known as Ama Otu Bea was a Deaconess of The Church of Pentecost and hails from Kasoa Bawjiase in the Central Region of Ghana. Madam Comfort had seven children.

She died on 22 February 2015 at the Okomfo Anokye aged 66. Although the cause of her death is not known, it is purported that she had been battling with liver and kidney ailment since October 2014 when she was taken ill.

Songs
Madam Comfort is popularly known for her hit songs "Asaase Dahɔ Gyan", "W’awo Me ɔba", "Abraham Sarah", "Mewo Agyapadeɛ", "Hena Na W’aye". However, her major Album is "Dom Hene", which was released in 2006 and has about 10 songs.

References

2015 deaths
Ghanaian Pentecostals
Date of birth missing
People from Kumasi
1949 births
20th-century Ghanaian women singers
21st-century Ghanaian women singers
21st-century Ghanaian singers
People from Central Region (Ghana)